Martin Richter (born December 6, 1977) is a Czech former professional ice hockey defenceman, who last played for Ciarko PBS Bank KH Sanok in the Polska Hokej Liga. Richter was drafted by the New York Rangers but never appeared in an NHL game.

Career statistics

Regular season and playoffs

International

References

External links 

1977 births
Czech ice hockey defencemen
Czech expatriate ice hockey players in Russia
Hartford Wolf Pack players
HC Bílí Tygři Liberec players
HC CSKA Moscow players
HC Karlovy Vary players
HC Olomouc players
HC Dynamo Pardubice players
HC Sparta Praha players
Living people
New York Rangers draft picks
SaiPa players
Södertälje SK players
HC Kometa Brno players
KH Sanok players
Sportspeople from Prostějov
Czech expatriate ice hockey players in the United States
Czech expatriate ice hockey players in Finland
Czech expatriate ice hockey players in Sweden
Czech expatriate ice hockey players in Slovakia
Czech expatriate sportspeople in Poland
Expatriate ice hockey players in Poland